Comparative studies of the Roman and Han empires is a historical comparative research involving the roughly contemporaneous Roman Empire and the Han dynasty of early imperial China. At their peaks, both states controlled up to a half of the world population and produced political and cultural legacies that endure to the modern era; comparative studies largely focus on their similar scale at their pinnacles and on synchronism in their rise and decline. The Han and Roman empires disintegrated at roughly the same time in the third and forth respectively centuries A.D. and the Western Roman empire fell in the fifth century. But the Chinese empire came together again under the Sui and Tang dynasties. 

The vast majority of studies focus on one or the other but the comparison of the two has attracted interest in the 21st century. Studies examine the concepts of ethnicity, identity, and the views of foreigners. Scholars also explore the relevance of ancient structures and characteristics to China's loss of world leadership in what has been called the Early Modern "Great Divergence."

History 
Historian Frederick John Teggart in 1939 published Rome and China: A Study of Correlations in Historical Events, covering the period of the Han Dynasty. Teggart criticized the dominant narrative form of history aiming mainly to emphasize the greatness of one's own nation. His purpose of the Correlations was scientific understanding of affairs of nations and generalization of causes and effects. History must inquire "not only into what has happened, but into the way things actually work in the affairs of men." Besides the scientific comparative approach, his Correlations with China was revolutionary also in breaking the bond of Eurocentrism: "The study of the past can become effective only when it is fully realized that all peoples have histories, that their history run concurrently and in the same world, and that the act of comparing is the beginning of all knowledge." The comparison, Teggart argued, revealed a correspondence in barbarian invasions throughout the continent of Eurasia, "and thus brought to light relations in the histories of widely separated areas which had not previously been suspected."

Walter Scheidel reviewed the previous scholarship when he explained the purpose of Stanford University's ancient Chinese and Mediterranean Empires Comparative History Project and the framework of its study in the early 21st century. Max Weber and Karl August Wittfogel both wrote works comparing ancient Mediterranean civilization and China; however, their studies have had little influence on later historians of the ancient world. Scheidel gives this as a contributing cause to the relative paucity of comparative studies between the two, though several scholars have made such studies. In the 1970s, principles of sociological examination have been identified that can be applied to the study of Han China and Rome. They draw on analytical and illustrative comparisons.

The majority of the research in the subject area has concentrated on looking at the intellectual and philosophical history of each society. Scheidel also noted a change in the direction of research in the 2000s, with a refocusing on the "nature of moral, historical, and scientific thought" in Greece and China. These researches have tended to focus on the philosophical and intellectual histories of China and the Greco-Roman world, and despite modern interest, gaps remain in the scholarship comparing Rome and the Han Empires. Scheidel notes that there are no comparative studies of high culture; there is also a virtual absence of work on  "political, social, economic or legal history" of the Greco-Roman world and ancient China, though historian Samuel Adshead does briefly address the issue. 

In his China in World History, Adshead compared the Han China and the Roman Empire before Constantine. He concluded that their "differences outweighed the similarities". However, his comparisons have received negative response from experts on Chinese history who cite his lack of use of Chinese sources, poor support of his arguments and eagerness to take poorly supported points as facts. More recently, sinologists have been engaging in comparative work on political institutions between China and Rome and between China and early modern Europe.

Political pattern
One of the most appealing reasons for historians to begin comparing Han China and Mediterranean empires, is their synchronous ascent to political hegemony over the Mediterranean and East Asia respectively:
Both systems existed as warring states during the Axial Age; 
Qin conquered its world in 221 BC, while Rome established its hegemony over the Mediterranean in 189 BC; 
both empires endured for centuries until the Han Empire dissolved in 220 AD and Western Rome followed suit in 395;
both began reconquista in the sixth century but at this point proceeded in opposite directions—China under the Sui Dynasty completed its reunification while Justinian failed. 

The Sui-Justinian era marks the juncture when the two civilizations proceeded in reverse directions - China remained unified while the Mediterranean never repeated its ancient unity. Adshead called this a "major watershed" to "expansion in modern Europe" and to "implosion in pre-modern China." For Scheidel, "the most striking divergence concerns their afterlife: the effective absence of universal empire from the post-Roman Europe and its serial reconstitution in East Asia," and regrets that the causes for this divergence remain neglected in the research. 

Historian Max Ostrovsky partly filled this gap in the research. He used the comparative analysis to find out what caused the divergence: China never expanded beyond the Great Wall, Tibet, or overseas. By contrast, the Mediterranean civilization was ever-expanding beyond the Roman limes, northward and eastward during the Middle Ages, and overseas afterwards. European kingdoms turned their exceeding energies outward and internal European power was balanced. 

Adshead similarly supposed that due to "isolation of China behind desert, mountains and jungles … and with its back to a dead ocean," the Chinese elites strove to unity more than the European. Sinologist Victoria Tin-bor Hui drew a geopolitical explanation too. The ancient Chinese system, she wrote, was relatively enclosed, whereas the European system began to expand its reach to the rest of the world from the onset of system formation. In addition, overseas provided outlet for territorial competition, thereby allowing international competition on the European continent to trump the ongoing pressure toward convergence.

In the field of comparative studies between empires, not just Rome and Han, Shmuel Eisenstadt's The Political System of Empires (1963) has been described as influential as it pioneered the comparative approach. In modern studies of imperialism, however, ancient China has generally been overlooked. In Scheidel's words, "[compared to the study of Europe and China in the early modern period] the comparative history of the largest agrarian empires of antiquity has attracted no attention at all. This deficit is only explicable with reference to academic specialization and language barriers". This changed with the emergence of the United States of America as effectively the only superpower in the world after the fall of the Soviet Union in the late 20th century. The event led to a renewed interest in empires and their study. For instance, the Roman Empire has occasionally been held up as a model for American dominance. The United States' hegemony is unprecedented in the modern system and thus the only illuminating cases can be found in pre-modern systems: "One difficulty with analyzing unipolarity is that we have mainly the current case, although examining Roman Europe and Han China could be illuminating."

In order to illuminate, Ostrovsky compared the evolution of the early hegemonies of Rome (189-168 BC) and Qin (364-221 BC). Since the condition of global closure (impossibility to expand) makes our world system more similar to China than Rome, the Chinese political pattern is supposed to be more relevant for us than the Roman. This implies hard anti-hegemonic balancing like against Qin rather than soft balancing like against Rome, total war and sweeping conquest like Qin in 230-221 BC rather than Rome's gradual annexations, and, if civilization survives, a cosmopolitan revolution, like the Han revolution in 206 BC and the Edict of Caracalla in AD 212, which similarly would turn the global American Empire into World State. Since the modern system will remain totally circumscribed until the end of history, this World State is likely to be permanent like the Chinese rather than temporary like the Roman.

Rationale 
According to Adshead's book China in World History, comparing Han China and Roman Europe gives context and assists understanding of China's interactions and relations with other civilisations of Antiquity. "Other comparisons could be made ... None, however, offers so close a parallel with Han dynasty as the Roman empire". In the opinion of Scheidel:

Comparative analysis, Scheidel added elsewhere, generates new causal insights which are impossible for analysis confined to single cases. Regarding why China and Rome, Scheidel explains that these two were among the largest (especially by population) and persistent of pre-modern empires, and in addition expanding and collapsing at roughly the same time. In the words of Fritz-Heiner Mutschler and Achim Mittag, "Comparing the Roman and Han empires contributes not only to understanding the trajectories along which the two civilizations developed, but also to heightening our awareness of possible analogies between the present and the past, be it with regard to America or China." Recent work by Ronald A. Edwards shows how such comparisons can be helpful in understanding ancient Han Chinese and Roman European political institutions. 

For Ostrovsky, the comparative analysis is vital for understanding the fall of Rome and the survival of China. The former case is one of most extensive historical researches and counts multiple factors all of which can be true. Regarding the question why the fall of Rome was fatal, however, the comparison with the Han China is the key rationale. It outlines the decisive factor (geopolitical circumscription) among multiple secondary. Moreover, he claims, it probably illuminates where we are heading.

At last, comparison between the Roman and Han empires is aided by the rich amount of written evidence from both, as well as other artefactual sources.

See also 

 Sino-Roman relations
 Translation of Han dynasty titles

References

Citations

Sources

Further reading 
 
 G. E. R. Lloyd, and Nathan Sivin, The Way and the Word: Science and Medicine in Early China and Greece (New Haven: Yale University Press, 2002)

 
 Lisa Ann Raphals, Knowing Words: Wisdom and Cunning in the Classical Traditions of China and Greece (Ithaca, N.Y: Cornell University Press, 1992)

External links 
 
 Stanford University's Ancient Chinese and Mediterranean Empires Comparative History Project (ACME)
 "Comparing Early Imperial Rome and Western Han Chang'an," Interview with University of California, Berkeley, professors Michael Nylan and Carlos Noreña.

Han dynasty
Roman Empire
Comparative historical research